Santo Estêvão (English: Saint Stephen) is a former parish (freguesia) in the municipality of Lisbon, Portugal. At the administrative reorganization of Lisbon on 8 December 2012 it became part of the parish Santa Maria Maior.

Main sites
Santo Estêvão Church
Nossa Senhora dos Remédios Chapel
Azevedo Coutinho Palace
Condes de Balsemão Palace
Military Museum
Santa Apolónia Station

References 

Former parishes of Lisbon